The Chippewa Operating System (COS) is a discontinued operating system developed by Control Data Corporation for the CDC 6600, generally considered the first supercomputer in the world. The Chippewa was initially developed as an experimental system, but was then also deployed on other CDC 6000 machines. 

The Chippewa was a rather simple job control oriented system derived from the earlier CDC 3000. Its design influenced the later CDC Kronos and SCOPE operating systems. Its name was based on the Chippewa Falls research and development center of CDC in Wisconsin.

It is distinct from and preceded the Cray Operating System (also called "COS") at Cray.

See also
 History of supercomputing
 Timeline of operating systems

Bibliography

References

Discontinued operating systems
Supercomputer operating systems
Control Data Corporation operating systems